In chemistry, a halide (rarely halogenide) is a binary chemical compound, of which one part is a halogen atom and the other part is an element or radical that is less electronegative (or more electropositive) than the halogen, to make a fluoride, chloride, bromide, iodide, astatide, or theoretically tennesside compound. The alkali metals combine directly with halogens under appropriate conditions forming halides of the general formula, MX (X = F, Cl, Br or I). Many salts are halides; the hal- syllable in halide and halite reflects this correlation. All Group 1 metals form halides that are white solids at room temperature.

A halide ion is a halogen atom bearing a negative charge. The halide anions are fluoride, chloride, bromide, iodide and astatide. Such ions are present in all ionic halide salts. Halide minerals contain halides.

All these halides are colourless, high melting crystalline solids having high negative enthalpies of formation.

Tests
 : no precipitate
 : white
 : creamy (pale yellow)
 : green (yellow)

For organic compounds containing halides, the Beilstein test is used.

Uses
Metal halides are used in high-intensity discharge lamps called metal halide lamps, such as those used in  modern street lights.  These are more energy-efficient than mercury-vapor lamps, and have much better colour rendition than orange high-pressure sodium lamps. Metal halide lamps are also commonly used in greenhouses or in rainy climates to supplement natural sunlight.

Silver halides are used in photographic films and papers. When the film is developed, the silver halides which have been exposed to light are reduced to metallic silver, forming an image.

Halides are also used in solder paste, commonly as a Cl or Br equivalent.

Synthetic organic chemistry often incorporates halogens into organohalide compounds.

Compounds

Examples of halide compounds are:
 Sodium chloride (NaCl)
 Potassium chloride (KCl)
 Potassium iodide (KI)
 Lithium chloride (LiCl)
 Copper(II) chloride
 Silver chloride (AgCl)
 Calcium chloride
 Chlorine fluoride (ClF)
 Organohalides
 Bromomethane
 Iodoform
 Hydrogen chloride (HCl)
Hydrogen bromide(HBr)

Silicon 

 SiF4 (a gas)
 SiCl4
 SiBr4
 SiI4
 SiAt4
 SiTs4

See also
 Salinity
 Organohalide
 Hydrogen halide
 Silver halide

References

Salts